John Larkin may refer to:

Businessmen and public officials
John Larkin (Northern Ireland), Attorney General for Northern Ireland as of May 2, 2020
John D. Larkin (1845–1926), American businessman
John Larkin Jr. (1804–1896), American businessman, banker and politician
John Larkin, English politician who competed in Liverpool City Council election, 1946

Performers
John Larkin (actor, born 1877) (1877–1936), African-American film actor and songwriter
John Larkin (actor, born 1912) (1912–1965), American actor in radio dramas
John Paul Larkin (1942–1999), American scat singing musician known as Scatman John

Religious figures
John Larkin (Deacon of Charlestown) (1735–1807), American Revolutionary War-era minister
John Larkin (Jesuit) (1801–1858), American president of Fordham University

Writers
John Larkin (author) (born 1963), Australian author
John Larkin (screenwriter) (1901–1965), American screenwriter

Others
John Larkin, American Quaker settler in 17th century (Larkin's Hill Farm)
John Larkin (cricketer) (1726–1782), English cricketer
John Larkin, husband of Swedish-American folk sculptor Anna Larkin (1855–1939)

See also
John Davis Larkins Jr. (1909–1990), American judge
Larkin (disambiguation)